Wimbledon most often refers to:

 Wimbledon, London, a district of southwest London
 Wimbledon Championships, the oldest tennis tournament in the world and one of the four Grand Slam championships

Wimbledon may also refer to:

Places

London
 Wimbledon (ecclesiastical parish)
 Wimbledon (UK Parliament constituency)
 Municipal Borough of Wimbledon, a former borough

Other places 
 Wimbledon, New South Wales, Australia, see Georges Plains, New South Wales
 Wimbledon, New Zealand, a locality in the Tararua District of New Zealand
 Wimbledon, North Dakota, a small town in the United States

Sport
 Wimbledon RFC, an amateur rugby club
 Wimbledon F.C., a former football club (1899–2004)
 AFC Wimbledon, a professional football club
 AFC Wimbledon Women, a women's football club
 Wimbledon Dons, a former motorcycle speedway team
 Wimbledon Hockey Club, a field hockey club based in Wimbledon
 Wimbledon Stadium, a now-demolished dog and motor cycle racing track

Other uses
 Wimbledon (film), a film set around the championships 
 Wimbledon College, a Roman Catholic secondary school
 Wimbledon station, a major railway station, a tube station and a Tramlink stop in the suburb
 Edward Cecil, 1st Viscount Wimbledon (1572–1638)
 SS Wimbledon, a British ship, and 
 the S.S. Wimbledon legal case named for it, adjudicated by the Permanent Court of International Justice in 1923

See also
 All England Lawn Tennis and Croquet Club, the venue for the tennis tournament
 Radio Wimbledon, the official radio station for the Wimbledon Tennis Championships
 South Wimbledon tube station, a London Underground station
 Wimbledon Chase railway station, a railway station
 Wimbledon Cup (disambiguation)
 Wimbledon Effect, the success of foreign financial firms in London
 Wimbledon Park tube station, a London Underground station